WDXY (1240 AM) is a conservative radio station broadcasting a News Talk Information format. It is licensed to Sumter, South Carolina, United States. The station is currently owned by Community Broadcasters, LLC and features programming from ABC Radio.

Programming
Programming on WDXY includes mostly national conservative talk programming, such as Dan Bongino, Sean Hannity, and Glenn Beck. The station also airs a local morning show, "Wake Up Carolina".

References

External links
WDXY Facebook

DXY
1960 establishments in South Carolina
Radio stations established in 1960